The list of neighborhoods of Kansas City, Missouri has nearly 240 neighborhoods. The list includes only Kansas City, Missouri and not the entire Kansas City metropolitan area, such as Kansas City, Kansas.

Kansas City, Missouri
Kansas City, Missouri has nearly 240 neighborhoods including Downtown, 18th and Vine, River Market, Crossroads, Country Club Plaza, Westport, the new Power and Light District, and several suburbs. The Neighborhood & Community Services Department of the City of Kansas City, Missouri maintains an official registry of neighborhood associations, many of which overlap, and a map of neighborhoods.

CBD-Downtown
 CBD-Downtown

Greater Downtown

 18th and Vine
 Beacon Hill-McFeders
 Columbus Park
 Crossroads
 Hospital Hill
 Library District
 Longfellow/Dutch Hill
 Quality Hill
 River Market
 Union Hill
 West Side

East Side

 Ashland Ridge
 Blue Hills
 Blue Valley
 Boulevard Village
 Brown Estates
 Country Valley-Hawthorne Square
 Cunningham Ridge
 Dunbar
 East 23rd Street P.A.C.
 Eastwood Hills
 Glen Lake
 Glen Oaks
 Ingleside
 Ivanhoe
 Key Coalition
 Knoches Park
 Leeds
 Mount Cleveland
 Oak Park
 Palestine
 Parkview
 Riss Lake
 Santa Fe
 Sheraton Estates
 Stayton Meadows
 Sterling Acres
 Sterling Gardens
 Vineyard
 Vineyard Estates
 Washington-Wheatley
 Wendell Phillips

Midtown-Westport

 Center City
 Coleman Highlands
 Hanover Place
 Hyde Park
 Manheim Park
 Mount Hope
 Old Hyde Park Historic District, Inc.
 Old Westport
 Plaza Westport
 Roanoke
 Southmoreland
 Squier Park
 Valentine
 Volker
 Westport

Northeast

 Forgotten Homes
 Independence Plaza
 Indian Mound
 Lykins
 Northeast Industrial District
 Paseo West
 Pendleton Heights
 Scarritt Point
 Sheffield

North Blueridge

Northland

 Antioch Acres
 Barry Harbour
 Barry Heights
 Barry Woods/ Park Hill
 Beacon Hill
 Beulmar Acres
 Birmingham Bottoms
 Bradford Place
 Breen Hills
 Briarcliff
 Briarcliff West
 Chaumiere
 Chouteau Estates
 Claymont
 Claymont North
 Clayton
 Colonial Square
 Cooley Highlands
 Country Club Estates-Big Shoal
 Coves North
 Crestview Homes Association 1
 Davidson
 Dearfield
 Foxwoods-Carriage Hills
 Gashland
 Glenhaven
 Gracemor-Randolph Corners
 Greenwood
 Harlem
 Highland View
 Hill Haven
 Holiday Hills
 Jefferson Highlands
 KCI
 Lakeview Terrace
 Linden Park
 Line Creek-Northern Heights
 Maple Park
 Maple Park West
 Milton
 Minneville
 Meadowbrook Heights
 Nashua
 New Mark
 Northhaven Gardens
 Outer Gashland-Nashua
 Parkdale-Walden
 Park Forest
 Park Hill South/ South Platte
 Park Plaza
 Platte Brook North
 Platte Ridge
 Platte Woods
 Prairie Point-Wildberry
 Ravenwood-Somerset
 Riss Lake
 River Forest
 River View
 Royal Oaks North
 Sherrydale
 Sherwood Estates
 Shoal Creek
 Staley Farms
 Tanglewood-Regency North
 The Coves
 Winnetonka
 Winnwood-Sunnybrook
 Winnwood Gardens

Plaza area

 Brookside
 Countryside
 Country Club
 Country Club Plaza
 Country Club District
 Park Central-Research
 West Plaza
 Westport
 South Plaza
 Sunset Hill
 Rockhill
 Westwood Park

South Kansas City

 49-63 Coalition
 Armour Fields
 Armour Hills
 Bannister Acres
 Battleflood Heights
 Boone Hills
 Blue Hills Estates
 Blue Vue Hills
 Blue Ridge Farm
 Bridlespur
 Calico Farms
 Citadel
 Coachlight Square
 Country Lane Estates
 Crestwood
 Crossgates
 East Swope Highlands
 Fairlane
 Foxcroft-Glen Arbor
 Foxtown East
 Foxtown West
 Hickman Mills
 Hickman Mills South
 Hidden Valley
 Highview Estates
 Hillcrest
 Holmes Park
 Kirkside
 Knobtown
 Lea Manor
 Legacy East
 Lewis Heights
 Linden Hills-Indian Heights
 Little Blue Valley
 Loma Vista
 Longview
 Marlborough East
 Marlborough Heights
 Marlborough Pride
 Martin City
 Mission Lake
 Morningside
 Neighbors United For Action
 Newcastle
 New Santa Fe
 Noble-Gregory Ridge
 Oakwood
 Oak Meyer Garden
 Park Central-Research Hospital
 Red Bridge
 Red Bridge South
 Richards Gebaur
 Robandee-Fairwood
 Robandee South
 Rolling Meadows
 Romanelli West
 Royal Oaks
 Ruskin Heights
 Ruskin Hills
 Santa Fe Hills
 Sechrest
 Self-Help Neighborhood Council
 Stratford Estates
 Strupwood
 Swope Park Campus
 Swope Park-Winchester
 Swope Parkway-Elmwood
 Terrace Lake Gardens
 Tri-Blenheim
 Timber Valley
 Tower Homes
 Town Fork Creek
 Troost Avenue Lawn
 Unity Ridge
 Verona Hills
 Waldo
 Waldo West
 Walnut Grove
 Ward Estates
 Ward Parkway
 Ward Parkway Plaza
 Western Hills
 White Oak
 Woodbridge
 Wornall Homestead

References

External links
 Map of the neighborhoods in Kansas City